Batun (also Romanized as Bātūn and Bāţūn) is a village in Bakesh-e Do Rural District, in the Central District of Mamasani County, Fars Province, Iran. At the 2006 census, its population was 197, in 44 families.

See also

Arieh Batun-Kleinstub (born 1933), Israeli Olympic high jumper

References 

Populated places in Mamasani County